Pareiorhaphis garapia is a species of catfish in the family Loricariidae. It is native to South America, where it occurs in the Tramandaí River basin in the state of Rio Grande do Sul in Brazil. It is known to occur alongside the species Pareiohaphis nudulus and Rineloricaria aequalicuspis, alongside members of the genera Astyanax and Rhamdia. The species reaches  in standard length and is believed to be a facultative air-breather.

References 

Fish described in 2015
Catfish of South America
Freshwater fish of Brazil